Kenneth Otabor (born 13 May 2002) is a Nigerian footballer who currently plays as a midfielder for Iwate Grulla Morioka.

Career statistics

Club

Notes

References

2002 births
Living people
Nigerian footballers
Nigerian expatriate footballers
Association football midfielders
J3 League players
Iwate Grulla Morioka players
Expatriate footballers in Japan
Nigerian expatriate sportspeople in Japan
Sportspeople from Kaduna